Kilwinning is a town in North Ayrshire, Scotland. It is known as "The Crossroads of Ayrshire". Kilwinning was also a Civil Parish. The 2001 Census recorded the town as having a population of 15,908.
The estimated population in 2016 was 16,460.

History
According to John Hay, once the headmaster of the parish school in Kilwinning, "North Ayrshire has a history of religion stretching back to the very beginning of missionary enterprise in Scotland. The Celtic Christians or Culdees of the period of St Columba and St Mungo found here, in this part of Scotland, a fertile field for the propagation of the faith. Kilmarnock, Kilbride, Kilbirnie, are all, like Kilwinning, verbal evidence of the existence of 'Cillean' or cells of the Culdee or Celtic Church."

In the distant past, the town was called Sagtoun, or Saint's Town, after St. Winning, the founder of an early seventh-century church on this site. However, the actual identity of St. Winning is unclear. Some scholars have associated him with the Irish saint known as St Finnian of Moville, who died in the late sixth century.  Others believe he was a Welshman by the name of Vynnyn, and the Aberdeen Breviary of 1507 asserts that he was from Scotland. The work of Professor Owen Clancy of the University of Glasgow in 2001 makes another identification possible.  Clancy argued that, in fact, Saint Ninian and Saint Finnian were the same person, the difference being attributed to an error on the part of a medieval scribe. If that is so, then Ninian, who was a missionary to the Picts in Scotland, and Winning, who was deemed a Scotsman in the Aberdeen Breviary, could theoretically be one and the same as the Irishman named Finnian. The Aberdeen Breviary implies he was Irish. In early medieval times the term Scots/Scotland applied also to Ireland. It speaks of the saint originating from a Scottish province, setting sail with companions, and landing at Cunninghame in Lesser Scotland, the latter being a term used in those times to refer to the country which would later be designated by name Scotland.

The original town was situated at the Bridgend and Corsehill while the other bank of the river was the site of the abbey, its outbuildings, orchards, doocot, etc.

The Kilwinning Community Archaeology Project carried out a dig in Kilwinning Abbey in 2010, which revealed much about the life of the people in the area during the medieval period.

Architecture

Abbot Adam's Bridge, was constructed in mediaeval times with much of the original structure standing today. The bridge was widened in 1859.

Geography

Kilwinning is located on the banks of the River Garnock in Ayrshire, west/central Scotland. Kilwinning's neighbours are the coastal towns of Stevenston to the west and Irvine to the south while inland lies Dalry to the north.

Masonic links

Kilwinning is notable for housing the original Lodge of Freemasonry in Scotland. When the Lodges were renumbered, Kilwinning was kept as Lodge Number '0', the Mother Lodge of Scotland.

The origin of the Lodge is unclear with the first documentary evidence being a mention in The Schaw Statutes of 1598 and 1599, which identify it in its first paragraph as the "heid and secund ludge of Scotland".

The lodge's own legend attributes the formation to the building of the Abbey at Kilwinning in the 12th century. There existed in this period corporations or fraternities of masons, endowed with certain privileges and immunities, capable of erecting religious structures in the Gothic style. A party of these foreign masons is supposed to have come from Italy, or Cologne, for the purpose of building the Abbey at Kilwinning and to have founded there the first regularly constituted Operative Lodge in Scotland. The Lodge is reputed to have been held in the chapter house on the eastern side of the cloisters. On the broken walls and moldering arches of the Abbey numerous and varied Masons' marks may be seen, some very beautiful in design.

Modern Kilwinning

In 1966, Kilwinning fell within the area designated Irvine New Town. Kilwinning rapidly expanded with new estates built on surrounding farm land to meet the planned increase in population.

Today Kilwinning consists of the pedestrianised historic town centre, Bridgend (which originally was a separate village), both now surrounded by the estates of Corsehill, Woodwynd, Blacklands, Pennyburn, Whitehirst Park, and Woodside with the last three being added after its incorporation into Irvine New Town.

Older residents sometimes refer to the Blacklands as the "Ironworks" after the Eglinton Iron Works which once occupied the land, the only surviving building of that time is now Nethermains Community Centre, although for many years the "slag hill" towered over the area. It was cleared in 1979, and the stone used to build the terminal at Hunterston, with the site being landscaped as Almswall Park.

The Main Street of Kilwinning has recently been refurbished as part of the regeneration of the Irvine Bay area by Irvine Bay Regeneration Company.

Eglinton Castle and Country Park

The ancient seat of the Earls of Eglinton, it is located just south of Kilwinning. Built between 1797 and 1802 in Gothic castellated style dominated by a central 100-foot (30 m) large round keep and four 70-foot (21 m) outer towers, it was second only to Culzean Castle in appearance and grandeur. The foundation stone of the new Eglinton Castle in Kilwinning was laid in 1797, the 12th Earl of Eglinton, was proud to have the ceremony performed by Alexander Hamilton of Grange, grandfather of the American Alexander Hamilton.

The castle is chiefly remembered, in modern times, as the scene of the Eglinton Tournament in 1839, which was a magnificent display. Funded and organized by Archibald Montgomerie, 13th Earl of Eglinton, the revival-medieval tournament, attracted thousands of visitors to see the combatants and the ladies in their finery. Among the guests was the future Emperor of the French—Napoleon III. The tournament was an ironic contrast between the old and the new! Excursion trains, among the first ever, were run from Ayr (pre-dating the formal opening of the line in 1840).

Today the castle is a ruin. The Tournament perhaps marked a turning point, being a severe drain on the Eglinton family fortune, which coincided with bottomless expenditure on the Ardrossan harbour and the Glasgow, Paisley and Ardrossan Canal. The castle fell into disrepair after being unroofed in 1925 and was used for Commando demolition practice during World War II, the remains were demolished to the level they are today in 1973. Eglinton Country Park is now a tourist attraction.

Industry and commerce

Kilwinning was a noted centre of Archery in medieval times. Later the town had an association with coal mining, quarrying, iron-founding and textile manufacture, now long since declined.

The Pringle knitwear company originally manufactured their goods in Kilwinning. Another company that existed was Wilson's Foods, which operated a plant in the grounds of the Eglinton Estate, but this has since closed.

The mill on the banks of the River Garnock briefly fell under the ownership of Blackwood Brothers of Kilmarnock before closing entirely. The site of the mill is largely unchanged, though part of the old factory has been demolished, and the former mill shop now operates as the offices and salesroom for a local car dealership that now uses the site.

The Nethermains Industrial Estate is home to many industrial units of the type commonly built in the 1960s and 1970s as modular units ideal for light industry. Fullarton Computer Industries are one of the large employers in this site. Modern Kilwinning's industries include the manufacture of plastics and electronics. Almost 1/4 of Kilwinning's workforce is employed by manufacturing.

Transport

Rail

The services stopping at Kilwinning:

 Glasgow Central –  + 
 Glasgow Central – Ayr – 
 Edinburgh Waverley or Glasgow Central – Ayr

Road

Kilwinning has road links with the rest of Ayrshire. The town is bypassed by the A78 dual carriageway, which provides connections to the A71 and A77 dual carriageways and the Glasgow bound M77 motorway.

Bus

Kilwinning is served by Stagecoach West Scotland and Shuttle Buses.

11 Ardrossan – Kilmarnock
25 Montgomerie Park / Bourtreehill / Broomlands / Irvine Cross – Kilbirnie / Beith
27 Irvine – Whitehurst Park (Mon – Sat Evenings Only)
29 Irvine / i3 Industrial Area – Whitehurst Park (Mon – Sat)
38 Riverway Retail Park – David Gage St (Mon – Sat)
X34 Glasgow – Irvine Cross / Irvine railway station / Bourtreehill 
X36 Glasgow – Ardrossan

Air

Airline operators within the Airport maintain routes to many UK, European and North American destinations.

Education
There is one secondary school in the town, Kilwinning Academy, although until recently the town was also served by St Michael's Academy.

Kilwinning's primary schools are: Corsehill Primary School, Abbey Primary School, Blacklands Primary School, St Winning's Primary School, Pennyburn Primary School, Whitehirst Park Primary School and St Luke's Primary School. (St Michael's Academy amalgamated with St Andrew's Academy of Saltcoats. Both previous Catholic secondary schools have since been demolished. A new building stands in its place, next to the St Andrews Academy site now known as St Matthews Academy providing education for the towns surrounding saltcoats.

A large campus of Ayrshire College (formerly James Watt College) was built in Kilwinning and was completed in the summer of 2000 ready for the first intake of students in August that year. Its arrival has brought some benefits to the town with increased revenue from the students supporting local businesses. Since 2013 the campus has been part of Ayrshire College.

It is notable that 37% of Kilwinning residents aged 16–74 have no formal qualifications; the national average is 33%.

There are a number of Community Halls in Kilwinning: Nethermains Community Centre, Cranberry Moss Community Centre, Whitehurst Community Centre, Pryde, The Woodwynd Hall and the Love Memorial Hall.

Sport

Archery

The Ancient Society of Kilwinning Archers is believed to date back to 1483 and while records are only available from 1688, there is a reference in the early minutes, which would appear to confirm this assumption.

The sport still continues in Kilwinning to this very day. The annual papingo shoot is held in the grounds of the old Abbey on the first Saturday in June, when the wooden bird is mounted on a pole and suspended from the clock tower to allow the archers to attempt to dislodge the wings and then the bird itself. In 2014, Michael Portillo visited the Ancient Society of Kilwinning Archers during a visit to Kilwinning on his Great British Railway Journeys TV series for the BBC.

Football

Kilwinning Community Football Academy or Kilwinning FA are a large community football setup within the town offering footballing activity for children as young as one year old all the way up to their senior ladies team.

Kilwinning Rangers F.C., or The Buffs as they are more affectionately known, play their home games at Buffs Park and compete in the Western Region Premiership. They play in blue and white hoops.

The team was formed in 1899 as a Juvenile football club, originally playing at Blacklands Park, which they shared with the then senior side of Eglinton Seniors. They officially became a Junior football club on 26 July 1902.

The name Buffs was first recorded on 21 September 1900 when the local paper, the Irvine Herald, recorded that the so-called Buffs had had an emphatic victory over Kilmarnock Belgrove. Kilwinning Rangers have had periods of success throughout their history, and proudly boast that they were the first, and last Ayrshire Club to win the Scottish Junior Cup in the twentieth century!

Dirrans Athletic AFC were formed in 1946.  They currently play in the Ayrshire Amateur Football league Premier Division.

Kilwinning Sports Club, or KSC as it is known locally, was launched in July 2002 in the Pennyburn area of Kilwinning.

Notable residents

Robert Baillie, (1602–1662), Covenanter, professor of divinity at the University of Glasgow, member of the Westminster Assembly and Presbyterian propagandist
Bernard, Abbot of Kilwinning, Abbot of Arbroath and Bishop of the Isles
Crawford Boyd, footballer
Des Browne, politician
Quintin Craufurd, author
Joe Donnachie, footballer
Hal Duncan, writer
Henry Eckford, shipbuilder
Julie Fleeting, footballer
Colin Friels, actor
Colin Hay, musician and lead singer of Men at Work 
Joseph Kain, American businessman and politician
James MacMillan, composer
Dougie McCracken, footballer
Gerry McGowan, footballer
Lewis Morrison, footballer
Andrew O'Hagan, author and novelist
James Service, Australian Colonial Politician, Premier of Victoria, born in Kilwinning in 1827
Robert William Service, poet and writer, spent part of his childhood in Kilwinning with his grandfather
Gordon Smith, footballer
Penny Tranter, weather forecaster
John White, Church of Scotland minister and twice Moderator of the General Assembly

See also
 The Lands of Ashgrove, previously known as Ashenyards

References

External links 

Kilwinning Community Council
Kilwinning's website
Irvine Bay Regeneration
The Gazetteer for Scotland
 

Towns in North Ayrshire